Zhao Zhihong (5 September 1972 – 30 July 2019), nicknamed The Smiling Killer and Demon, was a Chinese serial killer and rapist. He admitted to committing a total of 20 serious crimes between 1996 and 2005, including raping and killing at least 6 women in Ulanqab and Hohhot in Inner Mongolia. He was executed in 2019, following a court verdict.

Biography 
Zhao Zhihong was born on 5 September 1972, in the village of Yongxing, Liangcheng County. After graduating from school, he worked in low-skill jobs without staying anywhere for a long time.

Zhao committed his first murder on 9 April 1996, raping and strangling a young textile mill worker surnamed Yang in a public toilet in Hohhot. Her body was discovered by an 18-year-old Chinese Mongol named Huugjilt, who was mistakenly accused of the murder, forced to confess by investigators and sentenced to death on 23 May 1996. He was executed by firing squad on 10 June 1996.

On 20 May 2000, Zhao committed a second rape-murder of a young girl in the Hohhot area, which remained unsolved for a long time. He did not kill again until 2005, when he raped and killed four girls and women. The first two occurred on 2 and 7 January, and the third on 24 February. At the same time, local authorities were seriously worried about the serial killings, offering a reward of 2,000 yuan for information about the killer's identity and whereabouts. In July 2005, Zhao killed his last victim.

Arrest, trial and execution 
In June 2005, a resident of the village of Tali by name of Yun Wen, in suburban Hohhot, where Zhao committed his last killings, identified the killer from a photo shoot. However, she did not know his name or place of residence. While looking for the offender with the police, she identified Zhao Zhihong at his workplace, and on 23 October 2005, he was arrested.

Zhao immediately confessed, admitting to having committed more than 20 crimes between 1996 and 2005, including 6 murders and 10 rapes, two of which were against minors. In addition, he was also responsible for several cases of robberies, theft and misappropriation of property. Most controversially, he admitted to killing the mill worker Yang in 1996, a crime for which the 18-year-old Huugjilt was executed.

Due to the constantly opening up of new circumstances of Zhao's crimes, the trial of the killer was adjourned all the time. At the same time, on 15 December 2014, the Hohhot District Court posthumously acquitted Huugjilt, publicly apologizing to his relatives and paying them 330,000 yuan in compensation.

Zhao's trial began on 5 January 2015, and was held behind closed doors. In total, the serial killer was charged with 21 crimes. Zhao himself expressed regret that an innocent man was executed for his crime, and apologized in his courtroom confession. Nevertheless, on 9 February 2015, the District Court of Hohhot found the 42-year-old guilty of 6 murders, 10 rapes and at least one case of robbery. He was deprived of his civil rights and sentenced to death by firing squad. In addition, according to the court's verdict, he was obliged to pay a fine of 155,000 yuan, of which 53,000 to the state and 102,000 to the victims' relatives.

On 30 July 2019, Zhao was executed. Before his execution, he refused a last meeting with the victim's relatives, which was due to him by law.

See also
List of serial killers by country

References 

1972 births
1996 murders in China
2000 murders in China
2019 deaths
20th-century Chinese criminals
21st-century Chinese criminals
21st-century executions by China
Chinese male criminals
Chinese people convicted of robbery
Chinese murderers of children
Chinese rapists
Executed Chinese serial killers
Executed people from Inner Mongolia
Male serial killers
People convicted of murder by China
People executed by China by firearm
People from Ulanqab
Violence against women in China